Volente is a village in Travis County, Texas (USA) located on the north shore of Lake Travis. A post office was first established at Volente in 1886 with Andrew J. Stanford as postmaster but was not incorporated until 2003. The population was 520 at the 2010 census.

Geography

Volente is located at  (30.445325, –97.907911).

Demographics

In terms of ethnicity, 84.4% were of Non-Hispanic White, 13.0% were of Hispanic and Latin-Americans, 3.0% were of Mixed. In terms of ancestry, 41.7% were of German, 30.0% were of English, 10.9% were of Irish, 7.3% were of French, 4.9% were of American, 3.9% were of Italian.

References

External links
Village of Volente
Volente Neighborhood Association
Volente Fire Department
Anderson Mill Area
Handbook of Texas

Villages in Travis County, Texas
Villages in Texas
Greater Austin